Tiospirone (BMY-13,859), also sometimes called tiaspirone or tiosperone, is an atypical antipsychotic of the azapirone class. It was investigated as a treatment for schizophrenia in the late 1980s and was found to have an effectiveness equivalent to those of typical antipsychotics in clinical trials but without causing extrapyramidal side effects. However, development was halted and it was not marketed. Perospirone, another azapirone derivative with antipsychotic properties, was synthesized and assayed several years after tiospirone. It was found to be both more potent and more selective in comparison and was commercialized instead.

Pharmacology

Pharmacodynamics
Tiospirone acts as a 5-HT1A receptor partial agonist, 5-HT2A, 5-HT2C, and 5-HT7 receptor inverse agonist, and D2, D4, and  α1-adrenergic receptor antagonist.

Binding profile

See also 
 Azapirone

References 

Abandoned drugs
Antipsychotics
Azapirones
Benzothiazoles
Piperazines